Mario Venuti (born 28 October 1963) is an Italian singer-songwriter, musician and record producer.

Life and career 
Born in Syracuse, Sicily, he started his career as a member of the new wave band Denovo. After the group disbanded, he debuted as a solo singer-songwriter in 1994, with the album Un po' di febbre. Following "Mai come ieri", a quite successful duet with Carmen Consoli, his solo career had his breakout in 2003, with the hit "Veramente". He collaborated as a songwriter with several artists, including Carmen Consoli, Delta-V, Raf and Antonella Ruggiero. He entered the main competition at the Sanremo Music Festival three times, winning the "Mia Martini" Critics Award in 2004 with the song "Crudele".

Discography 

 Album    
 1994 – Un po' di febbre
 1996 – Microclima
 1998 – Mai come ieri
 2003 – Grandimprese 
 2006 – Magneti
 2009 – Recidivo
 2012 – L'ultimo romantico
 2014 – Il tramonto dell'occidente

References

External links 
  
 
 Mario Venuti at Discogs

People from Syracuse, Sicily
1963 births
Italian pop singers
Italian male singers
Living people
Italian singer-songwriters